Harry Sharpe was an English professional footballer who played as an inside right in the Football League for Glossop.

Personal life 
Sharpe served as a gunner in the Royal Garrison Artillery during the First World War.

Career statistics

References

English Football League players
British Army personnel of World War I
Year of birth missing
Year of death missing
Footballers from Bury, Greater Manchester
Bury F.C. players
Glossop North End A.F.C. players
Association football inside forwards
Royal Garrison Artillery soldiers
English footballers
Military personnel from Lancashire